Following are the results of the 2007 National Amateur Cup, the annual open cup held by the United States Adult Soccer Association.

National Amateur Cup Bracket
Home teams listed on top of bracket

(*): replay after tied match

Final

National Amateur Cup
National Amateur Cup
2007